The following is a list of Super Dave Osborne Show episodes.  The Super Dave Osborne Show, also known as Super Dave, was Canadian/American sketch comedy variety show starring Bob Einstein as fictional stuntman Super Dave Osborne. It ran for five seasons for 97 episodes on Showtime in the US and the Global Television Network in Canada from 1987 to 1991, with each episode approximately 25 minutes long. Reruns started airing on Comedy Gold on September 6, 2011.

Episodes overview
The show would be introduced by announcer Mike Walden using the lighted billboard sign, showing the guest stars and Super Dave's assistants (Fuji and/or Donald) who would be appearing on the show. Typically, after a scene with Super Dave elsewhere in the compound followed by live performances in the studio, an audience member would be asked to turn the show over to Mike, who sported a different outfit every episode. Super Dave, arriving on the compound in a special vehicle, would then either prepare to perform a stunt or give a tour of a new area in the compound. The show would end with the stunt going wrong or an accident happening to him during the tour, leaving the Super one gravely injured (with Mike sometimes asking him if he was all right), giving a farewell speech to the audience.

Season one (1987)
The first season of the Super Dave Osborne show was filmed at Glen Warren Studios, in Toronto, Ontario, Canada, the same studio where episodes of Bizarre were taped.

Season two (1988)
Beginning with season two, episodes of the Super Dave Osborne show would be taped in the much larger Markham theatre in Markham, Ontario, Canada.

Season three (1989)

Season four (1990)

Season five (1991)

References

External links
 

Super Dave
Super Dave